James Sims (born December 28, 1953 in Galveston, Texas) is a former National Football League linebacker who played for the Tampa Bay Buccaneers in 1976. He attended Locke High School, Los Angeles Harbor College and the University of Southern California before being drafted by the New York Giants in the 12th round (288th overall) in the 1974 NFL Draft. Sims was a 19th round (225th overall) of the Hawaiians in the 1974 WFL College draft. However, Sims played for the New York Stars and Charlotte Hornets of the World Football League in 1974. The Hornets traded Sims to the Southern California Sun (WFL) in 1975.

References

Living people
1953 births
Tampa Bay Buccaneers players
American football linebackers
USC Trojans football players
Sportspeople from Galveston, Texas
Players of American football from Texas